Fu Manchu is a fictional character created by Sax Rohmer.

Fu Manchu may also refer to:

People
David Bamberg, magician who performed a character Fu Manchu on stage and screen

Art, entertainment, and media
Fu Manchu (band), an American stoner rock band
"Fu Manchu", a song by Frank Black from his 1993 debut solo album Frank Black
Fu Manchu (Marvel Comics), a Marvel Comics supervillain

Other uses
Fu Manchu moustache, a mustache style
Fu Manchu lionfish, a common name for Dendrochirus biocellatus

See also
Fu-manjū, a type of Japanese wheat gluten